St Anne's Church, Cefn Hengoed is a disused Church in Wales church in Cefn Hengoed, Caerphilly in South Wales.

The church dates from 1939 and was founded by Reverend John Owen Williams, who had started a cottage Sunday school in Cefn Hengoed in 1931. A Second World War air raid shelter is located at the side of the church.

The church required extra funds for a refurbishment in
2010. By 2015, the church was defunct, and together with some adjoining land, was offered for sale with a starting price of £150,000.

References

Cefn Hengoed
Churches completed in 1939